Jack William Roderick, FIStructE, FICE, FASCE FTSE, FAA (1913–1990) was Challis Professor of Civil Engineering at the University of Sydney from 1951 until his retirement in 1978. He was born in Edmonton, Alberta.

References

1913 births
1990 deaths
Canadian civil engineers
Fellows of the Australian Academy of Science
Scientists from Edmonton
Academic staff of the University of Sydney
Canadian emigrants to Australia